The Bible is the most translated book in the world, with more translations (including an increasing number of sign languages) being produced annually. The United Bible Societies is a global fellowship of around 150 Bible Societies with the aim of translating publishing, and distributing the Bible.

According to Wycliffe Bible Translators, in September 2022, 3,589 languages had access to at least a book of the Bible, including 1,248 languages with a book or more, 1,617 languages with access to the New Testament in their native language and 724 the full Bible. It is estimated by Wycliffe Bible Translators that translation may be required in 1,680 languages where no work is currently known to be in progress. They also estimate that there are currently around 2,846 languages in 157 countries which have active Bible translation projects (with or without some portion already published).

Bibles and Bible portions available online

There are currently over 2,877 versions in over 1,918 languages available digitally on bible.com and a similar number on the American Bible Society's bibles.org.

Geographically
 Bible translations into the languages of Africa
 Bible translations into the languages of China
 Bible translations into the languages of Europe
 Bible translations into the languages of France
 Bible translations into the languages of Hawaii
 Bible translations into the languages of India
 Bible translations into the languages of Indonesia and Malaysia
 Bible translations into Native American languages
 Bible translations into Oceanic languages
 Bible translations into the languages of the Philippines
 Bible translations into the languages of Russia
 Bible translations into the languages of Taiwan
 Bible translations into fictional languages

Alphabetically
 Afrikaans: Bible translations into Afrikaans
 Ainu: Bible translations into Ainu
 Albanian: Bible translations into Albanian
 Aleut: Bible translations into Eskimo-Aleut languages
 Amharic: Bible translations into Amharic
 Amis:  Bible translations into the languages of Taiwan
 Apache (Southern Athabaskan): Bible translations into Apache
 Arabic: Bible translations into Arabic
 Aramaic: Bible translations into Aramaic, Targum, Peshitta
 Armenian: Bible translations into Armenian
 Assamese: Bible translations into the languages of India
 Auca, Waodani, Huaorani: Bible translations into Native American languages
 Australian Kriol: Bible translations into Australian Kriol
 Avar: Bible translations into the languages of Russia
 Azerbaijani: Bible translations into Azerbaijani
 Basque: Bible translations into Basque
 Batak: Bible translations into the languages of Indonesia and Malaysia
 Belarusian: Bible translations into Belarusian
 Bemba, Cibemba: Bible translations into the languages of Africa
 Bengali: Bible translations into Bengali
 Bisaya-Inunhan: Bible translations into the languages of the Philippines
 Blackfoot: Bible translations into Native American languages
 Breton: Bible translations into Breton
 Bulgarian: Bible translations into Bulgarian
 Burmese: Bible translations into Burmese
 Buryat : Bible translations into Buryat
 Cakchiquel: Bible translations into Native American languages
 Cambodian: Bible translations into Cambodian
 Carrier: Bible translations into Athabaskan languages
 Catalan: Bible translations into Catalan
 Caucasian Albanian (Old Udi): Bible translations into Caucasian Albanian
 Cheyenne: Bible translations into Native American languages
 Cherokee: Bible translations into Cherokee
 Chinese: Bible translations into Chinese
 Choctaw: Bible translations into Native American languages
 Chope, Tshopi: Bible translations into the languages of Africa
 Comanche: Bible translations into Native American languages
 Coptic: Coptic versions of the Bible
 Cornish: Bible translations into Cornish
 Corsican: The translation of the Bible into the Corsican language is the work of Christian Dubois (2005).
 Cree: Bible translations into Cree
 Creole: Bible translations into creole languages
 Croatian: Bible translations into Croatian
 Czech: Bible translations into Czech
 Dakota: Bible translations into Native American languages
 Danish: Bible translations into Danish
 Dene Suline / Chipewa: Bible translations into Athabaskan languages
 Dutch: Bible translations into Dutch
 Dzongkha: Bible translations into Dzongkha
 English: List of English Bible translations, English translations of the Bible
 Esperanto: Bible translations into Esperanto
 Estonian: Bible translations into Estonian
 Finnish: Bible translations into Finnish
 Filipino: Bible translations into the languages of the Philippines
 French: Bible translations into French
 Gagauz: Bible translations into the languages of Russia
 Geʽez: Bible translations into Geʽez
 Georgian: Bible translations into Georgian
 German: Bible translations into German
 Gilbertese: Bible translations into Oceanic languages
 Gothic: Gothic Bible
 Greek: Bible translations into Greek, Septuagint
 Gujarati: Bible translations into the languages of India
 Gullah: Bible translations into creole languages
 Gwich'in (Kutchin): Bible translations into Athabaskan languages
 Haida: Bible translations into Native American languages
 Haitian Creole: Bible translations into creole languages
 Hakka: Bible translations into the languages of Taiwan
 Hawaiian: Bible translations into Polynesian languages
 Hawaiian Pidgin English: Bible translations into Hawaii Pidgin
 Hebrew: Bible translations into Hebrew
 Hindi: Bible translations into Hindi and Urdu
 Hmong: Bible translations into the languages of China
 Hopi: Bible translations into Native American languages
 Hungarian: Bible translations into Hungarian
 Icelandic: Bible translations into Icelandic
 Igbo: Bible translations into the languages of Africa
 Ilocano: Bible translations into Ilocano
 Indonesian: Bible translations into Indonesian
 Inupiaq, Inupiat : Bible translations into Inupiat
 Irish: Bible translations into Irish
 Italian: Bible translations into Italian
 Japanese: Bible translations into Japanese
 Jèrriais (Norman): Bible translations into the languages of France
 Kalmyk, Oirat: Bible translations into Kalmyk
 Kannada: Bible translations into Kannada
 Kashubian: Bible translations into Slavic languages (section Kashubian) 
 Kazakh: Bible translations into Kazakh
 Keres: Bible translations into Native American languages
 Khmer (Cambodian): Bible translations into Cambodian
 Khoekhoegowab (Damara/Nama): Bible translations into the languages of Africa
 Kikamba language (Kamba): Bible translations into the languages of Africa
 Konkani: Bible translations into Konkani
 Korean: Bible translations into Korean
 Koryak: Bible translations into the languages of Russia
 Koyukon: Bible translations into Athabaskan languages
 Kurdish: Bible translations into Kurdish
 Kyrgyz: Bible translations into Kyrgyz
 Ladakhi: Bible translations into Ladakhi
 Lao: Bible translations into Lao
 Lacandon: Bible translations into Native American languages
 Lahu: Bible translations into the languages of China
 Latin: Bible translations into Latin, Vetus Latina, Vulgate
 Latvian: Bible translations into Latvian
 Lisu: Bible translations into the languages of China
 Lithuanian: Bible translations into Lithuanian
 Lolcat: Bible translations into fictional languages
 Macedonian: Bible translations into Macedonian
 Malagasy: Bible translations into the languages of Africa
 Malay: Bible translations into Malay
 Malayalam: Bible translations into Malayalam
 Maltese: Bible translations into Maltese
 Manchu: Bible translations into Manchu
 Manx: Bible translations into Manx
 Maori: Bible translations into Oceanic languages
 Marathi: Bible translations into Marathi
 Miao: Bible translations into the languages of China
 Micmac: Bible translations into Native American languages
 Mixtec: Bible translations into Native American languages
 Mohawk: Bible translations into Native American languages
 Mongolian: Bible translations into Mongolian
 Naro: Naro Bible
 Navajo: Bible translations into Native American languages
 Naxi: Bible translations into the languages of China
 Nepali: Bible translations into Nepali
 Norwegian: Bible translations into Norwegian
 Nubian (Nobiin): Bible translations into Nubian
 Chichewa / Nyanja: Bible translations into the languages of Africa
 Mijikenda (formerly "Nyika"): Bible translations into the languages of Africa
 Occitan: Bible translations into the languages of France
 Ojibwa (Algonquian family, Canada): Bible translations into Native American languages
 O'odham (Mexico): Bible translations into Native American languages
 Oriya: Bible translations into Oriya
 Oromo: Bible translations into the languages of Africa
 Oshindonga: Bible translations into the languages of Africa
 Otjiherero: Bible translations into the languages of Africa
 Paniya: Bible translations into the languages of India
 Pashto: Bible translations into Pashto
 Persian: Bible translations into Persian
 Pipil / Nawat: Bible translations into Native American languages
 Polish: Bible translations into Polish
 Portuguese: Bible translations into Portuguese
 Prekmurje dialect of Slovene: Bible translations into Prekmurje Slovene
 Quechua, Runa simi: Bible translations into Native American languages
 Quenya (fictional): Bible translations into fictional languages
 Provençal: Bible translations into the languages of France
 Romani: Bible translations into Romani
 Romanian : Bible translations into Romanian
 Romansh : Bible translations into Romansh
 Russian: Bible translations into Russian
 Sakha: Bible translations into the languages of Russia
 Sanskrit: Bible translations into the languages of India
 Scots (Lallans; Lowland Scots): Bible translations into Scots
 Scottish Gaelic (Gàidhlig): Bible translations into Scottish Gaelic
 Sechwana: Bible translations into the languages of Africa
 Seneca (Iroquoi): Bible translations into Native American languages
 Serbian: Bible translations into Serbian
 Seri: Bible translations into Native American languages
 Shawi: Bible translations into Berber languages
 Shan: Bible translations into the languages of India
 Shor: Bible translations into the languages of Russia
 Sinhala: Bible translations into Sinhala
 Slavonic: Bible translations into Church Slavonic
 Slovak: Bible translations into Slovak
 Slovene: Bible translations into Slovene
 Sogdian: Bible translations into Sogdian
 Sorbian: Bible translations into Sorbian
 Sotho: Bible translations into the languages of Africa
 Spanish: Bible translations into Spanish
 Swahili: Bible translations into the languages of Africa
 Swedish: Bible translations into Swedish
 Syriac: Bible translations into Aramaic
 Tagalog/Filipino: Bible translations into the languages of the Philippines
 Taiwanese: Bible translations into the languages of Taiwan
 Tajik: Bible translations into Persian
 Tamazight, Berber: Bible translations into Berber languages
 Tamil: Bible translations into Tamil
 Tanana, Upper (Alaska): Bible translations into Native American languages
 Tashelhayt, Shilha language: Bible translations into Berber languages
 Tatar: Bible translations into the languages of Russia
 Telugu: Bible translations into Telugu
 Tewa, New Mexico: Bible translations into Native American languages
 Thai: Bible translations into Thai
 Tibetan: Bible translations into Tibetan
 Tlingit: Bible translations into Tlingit
 Tongan: Bible translations into Oceanic languages
 Tsimshian: Bible translations into Native American languages
 Tulu: Bible translations into the languages of India
 Turkish: Bible translations into Turkish
 Turkmen: Bible translations into Turkmen
 Tuvan: Bible translations into the languages of Russia
 Ukrainian: Bible translations into Ukrainian
 Urdu: Bible translations into Hindi and Urdu
 Uyghur: Bible translations into Uyghur
 Uzbek: Bible translations into Uzbek
 Valencian: Valencian Bible
 Vietnamese: Bible translations into Vietnamese
 Wa: Translation of the Bible into the Wa language.
 Wakhi: Bible translations into the languages of Russia
 Wampanoag: Bible translations into Native American languages
 Welsh: Bible translations into Welsh
 Xhosa: Bible translations into the languages of Africa
 Yiddish: Bible translations into Yiddish
 Yoruba: Bible translations into the languages of Africa
 Yupik languages: Bible translations into the languages of Russia
 Zulu: Bible translations into the languages of Africa
 Zuñi: Bible translations into Native American languages

See also
 :Category:Bible translators

References

External links
 Find.Bible links to translations in over 6,100 languages and dialects (as of April 2018 relating to 2,141 separate ISO639-3 registered languages)
 WorldBibles.org lists over 14,000 internet links to Bibles, New Testaments and portions in "over four thousand languages"
Online Bible—Read, Listen or Download Free: PDF, EPUB, Audio